Drumburgh railway station was near the village of Drumburgh (pronounced "Drumbruff"), Cumbria, England.

It was the junction station for the Port Carlisle Railway branch and the Silloth branch, serving both as a junction and transfer station and also serving the small village of Drumburgh. The station closed on 4 July 1955; nothing now remains of the station. The line to Silloth closed on 7 September 1964 as part of the Beeching cuts. Port Carlisle was two and a half miles away by train and Glasson was one and a quarter miles away. The journey time was nine minutes, although Glasson was a request stop.

History 

In 1819 a port was constructed at Port Carlisle and in 1821, the Carlisle Navigation Canal. was built to take goods to Carlisle. The canal was closed in 1853 and much of it was infilled by the Port Carlisle Railway Company who constructed a railway that started passenger services in 1854, discontinuing them two years later when the Carlisle & Silloth Bay Railway & Dock Company's (C&SBRDC) new railway to Silloth opened, utilising the Port Carlisle Branch as far as Drumburgh. A brief resurgence of business at Port Carlisle had taken place upon the opening of the railway, taken away however by the new port at Silloth and the transfer of the steamer service to Liverpool.

To reduce costs a horse-drawn service was provided in 1856 between Drumburgh, Glasson, and Port Carlisle; however, in 1914 steam power was introduced; finally to try to avoid closure a steam railmotor called 'Flower of Yarrow' was built and this service to Port Carlisle railway station via Drumburgh lasted until the branch was closed in 1932. Freight services to Port Carlisle had been withdrawn in 1899. The Port Carlisle Railway Company had agreed to supply a locomotive if the C&SBRDC provided rolling stock. The North British Railway leased the line from 1862; it was absorbed by them in 1880, and then taken over by the London and North Eastern Railway in 1923.

Four horse-drawn 'Dandy cars' were built by the North British Railway. The Dandy car was originally preserved at Carlisle, before being moved to the National Railway Museum at York. The Port Carlisle line became a day tourist attraction to Carlisle Victorians.

The 'Flower of Yarrow' Sentinel Railcar used on the line was driven by James Grey with T. Jackson as the fireman worked on the Port Carlisle Railway in 1932 before its final closure.

On 23 October 1950 a passenger train derailed near Drumburgh killing the Driver & Fireman.

Drumburgh remained open as a station and passing point on the Silloth branch until it closed on 4 July 1955, some years before Silloth railway station. A stub end of track was left in place running towards Glasson.

Infrastructure
The station sat to the south of the village, reached by minor road; it had a single central or island platform, a shelter and a signal box. A siding was present nearby on the line to Glasson. At Canal Junction the Port Carlisle line made an end on junction with the earlier goods branch from London Road and it was this section on to Drumburgh (pronounced drum-bruff) that was taken over by the Carlisle & Silloth Bay Railway & Dock Company. Immediately west of Drumburgh station the line branched off from the line to Silloth, passing under a minor road to Port Carlisle. The branch ran close to the south bank of the Solway Firth and the course of Hadrians Wall at Glasson and elsewhere, heading over low ground to the terminus of the line at Port Carlisle.

References

Sources

External links
 The station and line Cumbria Gazetteer
 Drumburgh station views Deborah Irwin
 The junction on an Edwardian 6" OS map National Library of Scotland
 The station and line Rail Maps Online
 The station and line, with mileages Railway Codes

Disused railway stations in Cumbria
Former North British Railway stations
Railway stations in Great Britain opened in 1854
Railway stations in Great Britain closed in 1955
1854 establishments in England
1955 disestablishments in England